A Private Enterprise is a 1974 British film directed by Peter K Smith. It stars Salmaan Peerzada as Shiv Verma, an Indian immigrant in Birmingham who attempts to start his own business. It is regarded as the first British Asian film.

External links 
 IMDB page for A Private Enterprise
 BFI Review of the film (with clips)
 
 Brief overview of the film
 Short review from Time Out

Films shot in London
Films set in London
Films about immigration
British Indian films
1974 films
Films set in Birmingham, West Midlands
British drama films
1974 drama films
1970s English-language films
1970s British films